Vermont Hatch Mansion is a historic home located at Cornwall in Orange County, New York. It was built in 1935 for Vermont Hatch and is a two-story, coursed ashlar stone dwelling in an eclectic French chateau style. It features a series of slate tiled hipped roofs. Also on the property is a gable roofed, stone garage.

It was listed on the National Register of Historic Places in 1995.

See also
Vermont Hatch

References

Houses on the National Register of Historic Places in New York (state)
Houses completed in 1935
Houses in Orange County, New York
National Register of Historic Places in Orange County, New York